The Little White River (formerly known as the South Fork of the White River) is a tributary of the White River, approximately 234 miles (377 km) long, in south central South Dakota in the United States.

It rises on the Pine Ridge Indian Reservation in southeastern Oglala Lakota County. It flows east past Martin and north of Lacreek National Wildlife Refuge. It flows into the Rosebud Indian Reservation and turns northeast, passing north of Rosebud and west of the  town of White River. It joins the White approximately 12 mi (19 km) SSE of Murdo.

See also
List of rivers of South Dakota

References

Rivers of South Dakota
Rivers of Oglala Lakota County, South Dakota
Rivers of Bennett County, South Dakota
Rivers of Mellette County, South Dakota